St Mary and St Michael's Church may refer to:
 Church of St Mary and St Michael, Bonds, Lancashire, England
 St Mary's and St Michael's Church, Burleydam, Cheshire, England
 St Mary and St Michael's Church, Great Urswick, Cumbria, England
 Church of St Mary and St Michael, Llanarth, Monmouthshire, Wales
 Church of St Mary and St Michael, Stepney, London, England

See also
 St Mary's Church (disambiguation)
 St Michael's Church (disambiguation)